2013 UEFA Women's Under-19 Championship First Qualifying Round will be the first round of qualifications for the Final Tournament of 2013 UEFA Women's Under-19 Championship, which will be held in Wales.

The 40 teams were divided into 10 groups of four teams, with each group being contested as a mini-tournament, hosted by one of the group's teams. After all matches have been played, the 10 group winners and 10 group runners-up along with the best third-placed team will advance to the second qualifying round.

Wales qualified as hosts while England, France and Germany received byes to the second round as the sides with the highest coefficients.

The draw was made on 15 November 2011 at UEFA headquarters in Nyon. Matches was played from 20 to 25 October 2012.

Seeding
Seeding of the four drawing pots is based on the past three seasons of qualifying. The hosts of the ten one-venue mini-tournament groups are indicated below in italics.

Tiebreakers
Tie-breakers between teams with the same number of points are:
 Higher number of points obtained in the matches played between the teams in question
 Superior goal difference resulting from the matches played between the teams in question
 Higher number of goals scored in the matches played between the teams in question
If now two teams still are tied, reapply tie-breakers 1-3, if this does not break the tie, go on.
 Superior goal difference in all group matches
 Higher number of goals scored in all group matches
 Drawing of lots

Group 1

Group 2

Group 3

Group 4

Group 5

Group 6

Group 7

Group 8

Group 9

Group 10

Ranking of third-placed teams
To determine the best third-placed from the first qualifying round, only the results against the winners and the runner-up teams in each group were taken into account.

Tiebreakers
The following criteria are applied to determine the rankings:
higher number of points obtained in these matches
superior goal difference from these matches
higher number of goals scored in these matches
fair play conduct of the teams in all group matches in the first qualifying round
drawing of lots

References

External links
UEFA.com; official website
Round on soccerway.com

1
2013 first
UEFA
2013 in youth sport